The Rukun Negara (also spelled Rukunegara; Malay for "National Principles") is the Malaysian declaration of national philosophy instituted by royal proclamation on Merdeka Day, 1970, in reaction to a serious race riot known as the 13 May Incident, which occurred in 1969. The incident proved at that time that Malaysian racial balance and stability was fragile. Immediately thereafter, the Malaysian government sought ways to foster unity among the various races in Malaysia. One of the methods used to encourage unity is the Rukun Negara.

The word Rukun Negara can refer to the whole declaration, the words after the preamble (beginning Maka kami...) or the five principles alone.

The formulation of the principles of the Rukun Negara was the efforts of the National Consultative Council (Majlis Perundingan Negara or MAPEN), headed by Tun Abdul Razak. The aim of the Rukun Negara is to create harmony and unity among the various races in Malaysia. Thereafter, the New Economic Policy (1971-1990) was launched in 1971, the aim was to create unity among the various races in Malaysia, through economic equality, via the reduction of the economic gap among the Malays and Bumiputera, with that of the Chinese and Indian communities in Malaysia.

The Rukun Negara bears similarity to the Pancasila national ideology/philosophy of neighbouring Indonesia.

History

13 May Incident 

On the 13 May 1969, three days after the 3rd general election, whereby the opposition parties made gains at the expense of the ruling coalition, a racial riot occurred in the nation, mainly in Kuala Lumpur. According to the government's report, 196 people were killed during the riot, while Western diplomatic sources suggested a toll close to 600. The riot had led to the government declaring a state of national emergency in the country and imposing a nationwide curfew.

Following the declaration of emergency, the National Operations Council (NOC) or Majlis Gerakan Malaysia (MAGERAN) in Malay was formed and acted as the administrative body of the country for the following 18 months. With the aim of restoring law and order in the country, the NOC implemented various security measures nationwide, this includes the suspension of newspaper publications, arresting of several individuals and the suspension of certain parts of the constitution.

Formation of National Consultative Council 
The National Consultative Council, NCC (Majlis Perundingan Negara in Malay) was formed on January 1970. The council consisted of the ministers of the NOC, representatives from state governments, political parties, press, trade unions, religious, social and professional groups in Malaysia. The council was tasked to discuss and propose solutions on issues regarding national unity, as well as formulating positive and practical guidelines that encourages national integration and racial unity to build a shared national identity amongst Malaysians. Discussions on the Rukun Negara had been made on the council's second meeting, with its members providing suggestions to the draft prepared by the Department of National Unity and its Research Advisory Group.

A committee on Rukun Negara, chaired by Tun Tan Siew Sin, was formed on the same meeting. Other members of the committee includes Ghazali Shafie, Syed Hussein Alatas and Datuk Harun Idris. Aside from the initial 12 members, several individuals had also attended the council's meeting and contributed to the drafting of Rukun Negara, which includes former Lord President of the Malaysian Supreme Court, Salleh Abas, and historian Khoo Kay Kim. The first meeting of the committee was held at the Treasury Operations Room, Kuala Lumpur on March 31, 1970, while a second meeting was held on May 17.

On the first meeting, a concept known as "Pillars of the Nation" was proposed and was later incorporated into the Rukun Negara, the Pillars were:

 Ketuhanan (Belief in God or Supreme Being)
 Kesetiaan (Loyalty)
 Keadilan (Justice)
 Kewarganegaraan (Citizenship)
 Keutuhan (Integrity of the Nation)
 Kebahagiaan (Well-being)
 Kesopanan (Canons of Decency)
After discussing with its members, the committee submitted a document regarding the Rukun Negara draft to the NCC and NOC for its consideration and approval. The document suggested some changes on the initial draft, such as replacing "Menjujung Perlembagaan" with "Keluhuran Perlembagaan". It was reviewed and discussed by the NCC before it was finally passed by the NOC on 13 August 1970 after some modifications.

Declaration 
The Rukun Negara was declared officially by His Majesty Tuanku Ismail Nasiruddin Shah, the fourth Yang di-Pertuan Agong of Malaysia on August 31, 1970, which is the Malaysian Independence Day. The declaration was held on the 13th Independence Day celebration at Dataran Merdeka (formerly known as Selangor Club Padang). The celebration was themed "Muhibbah dan Perpaduan" (Goodwill and Unity) and the government changed the term "Independence Day" (Hari Merdeka) to "National Day" (Hari Kebangsaan) to promote national unity.

Promoting the Rukun Negara 
On September 2, 1970, a meeting on the distribution of Rukun Negara was held in the Parliament Building. The meeting was presided by Dr. Agoes Salim, the Head of the Research Unit of the National Unity Department. It was decided by the attendees of the meeting that the Malay version of the text shall be the original, while the others as translations of the text. The recitation of the Rukun Negara was encouraged on official events and the text should be recited on the State Opening of the Parliament and State Legislative Assemblies. It was also proposed that a textbook on Rukun Negara should be provided to students, especially during the subject of Tatacara.

A brochure (buku risalah) was published and distributed by the Department of Information on the day of declaration of Rukun Negara. A pocket-sized version was also made for both the Malay and English version of the text. The Malay version was reprinted on 1983 following the new spelling system.

The Ministry of Information was responsible for distributing, promoting and explaining the Rukun Negara to the public. A three-day seminar was held to explain the content and meaning of Rukun Negara to all the ministry's officers. One of the writers of the declaration, Tan Sri Ghazali Shafie, also gave a talk on the annual general meeting of the department's Union of Employees regarding the Rukun Negara. Several promotional videos were also produced from time to time to be played on television, such as "Towards National Unity" by the National Film Department of Malaysia and the video for the "Today in History" programme (Hari Ini Dalam Sejarah) by the national archives.

Rukun Negara text

Recitation
It is a norm for primary and secondary public schools in Malaysia to recite the pledge weekly during a compulsory assembly. Pledge reading follows immediately after the singing of the Malaysian national anthem, Negaraku. Of some interest, the Rukun Negara could usually be found behind the cover of every exercise book that is typically used by primary and secondary Malaysian public school students. This is primarily a move recognised to have been formulated to emulate the similar tactic introduced by the Singapore government immediately after its expulsion from the Malaysian federation in 1965.

On 8 December 2005, the Malaysian government has made reading of the pledge compulsory at official functions. The announcement was made a few months after the government made singing of the national anthem as compulsory at every official function.

See also
 Malaysian New Economic Policy
 Singapore National Pledge
 Pancasila

References

Jeong Chun Hai @Ibrahim & Nor Fadzlina Nawi. (2012). Principles of Public Administration: Malaysian Perspectives. Kuala Lumpur: Pearson. 
Jeong Chun Hai @Ibrahim. (2007). Fundamental of Development Administration. Selangor: Scholar Press.

External links
 Rukun Negara Campaign (MP3)
 Rukun Negara on Malaysian Government Portal
Rukun Negara 50th Anniversary Webpage Archived from the original.
Documentary released by Bernama on the 50th Anniversary of Rukun Negara (Episode 1) (Episode 2)

Malaysian culture
National symbols of Malaysia
1970 establishments in Malaysia
Oaths of allegiance
State ideologies
Malaysian political slogans